General Pitt may refer to:

George Dean Pitt (died 1851), British Army general
William Augustus Pitt (c. 1728–1809), British Army general
John Pitt, 2nd Earl of Chatham (1756–1835), British Army general
John E. Pitts Jr. (1924–1977), U.S. Air Force brigadier general

See also
Walter Pitt-Taylor (1878–1950), British Army general